Colorado tick fever (CTF) is a viral infection (Coltivirus) transmitted from the bite of an infected Rocky Mountain wood tick (Dermacentor andersoni). It should not be confused with the bacterial tick-borne infection, Rocky Mountain spotted fever. Colorado tick fever is probably the same disease that American pioneers referred to as "mountain fever".

Colorado tick fever virus (CTFV) infects haemopoietic cells, particularly erythrocytes, which explains how the virus is transmitted by ticks and also accounts for the incidence of transmission by blood transfusion.

Signs and symptoms
First signs or symptoms can occur about three to six days after the initial tick bite, although it can have incubation periods of up to 20 days.  Patients usually experience a two-staged fever and illness which can continue for three days, diminish, and then return for another episode of one to three days.  The virus has the ability to live in the bloodstream for up to 120 days; therefore, coming in contact without proper precautions and the donation of blood are prohibited.

Initial symptoms include fever, chills, headaches, pain behind the eyes, light sensitivity, muscle pain, generalized malaise, abdominal pain, hepatosplenomegaly, nausea and vomiting, and a flat or pimply rash.  During the second phase of the virus, a high fever can return with an increase in symptoms. CTF can be very severe in cases involving children and can even require hospitalization.  Complications with this disease have included aseptic meningitis, encephalitis, and hemorrhagic fever, but these are rare.

CTF is seasonal, mostly occurring in the Rocky Mountain region of the United States and usually in altitudes from 4,000 to 10,000 feet (1,600 to 3,000 meters).  Patients with CTF are mostly campers and young males, who most likely have been bitten because of their  activities.

Cause

Virology

The virus particle, like other coltiviruses, is about 80 nm in diameter and is generally not enveloped.  The double-stranded RNA viral genome is about 20,000 bp long and is divided into 12 segments, which are termed Seg-1 to Seg-12.  Viral replication in infected cells is associated with characteristic cytoplasmic granular matrices.  Evidence suggests the viral presence in mature erythrocytes is a result of replication of the virus in hematopoetic erythrocyte precursor cells and simultaneous maturation of the infected immature cells rather than of direct entry and replication of CTFV in mature erythrocytes.

Tick
The Rocky Mountain wood tick is usually found attached to a host, but when it is without a host, it hides in cracks and crevices, as well as soil. If for some reason the tick is not able to find a host before the winter, it will stay under groundcover until spring, when it can resume its search.  The wood tick does not typically seek hosts in the hottest summer months.  Adult ticks tend to climb to the tops of grasses or low shrubs, attaching themselves to a host wandering by. They secure the attachment by secreting a cement-like substance from their mouths, inserting it into the host.

Transmission
Colorado tick fever is acquired by tick bite. No evidence of natural person-to-person transmission has been found. However, rare cases of transmission from blood transfusions have been reported. The virus which causes Colorado tick fever may stay in the blood for as long as four months after onset of the illness.

Diagnosis
A combination of clinical signs, symptoms, and laboratory tests can confirm the likelihood of having CTF.  Some tests include complement fixation to Colorado tick virus, immunofluorescence for Colorado tick fever, and some other common laboratory findings suggestive of CTF, including leucopenia, thrombocytopenia, and mildly elevated liver enzyme levels.

Detection of viral antibodies on red blood cells is possible.

Prevention

To avoid tick bites and infection, experts advise:
 Avoid tick-infested areas, especially during the warmer months.
 Wear light-colored clothing so ticks can be easily seen. Wear a long sleeved shirt, hat, long pants, and tuck pant legs into socks.
 Walk in the center of trails to avoid overhanging grass and brush.
 Clothing and body parts should be checked every few hours for ticks when spending time outdoors in tick-infested areas. Ticks are most often found on the thigh, arms, underarms, and legs. Ticks can be very small (no bigger than a pinhead). Look carefully for new "freckles".
 The use of insect repellents containing DEET on skin or permethrin on clothing can be effective. Follow the directions on the container and wash off repellents when going indoors.
 Remove attached ticks immediately.

Contracting the CTF virus is thought to provide long-lasting immunity against reinfection.  However, it is always wise to be on the safe side and try to prevent tick bites.

Treatment

No specific treatment for CTF is yet available.  The first action is to make sure the tick is fully removed from the skin, then acetaminophen and analgesics can be used to help relieve the fever and pain.  Aspirin is not recommended for children, as it has been linked to Reye’s syndrome in some viral illnesses.   Salicylates should not be used because of thrombocytopenia, and the rare occurrence of bleeding disorders.  People who suspect they have been bitten by a tick or are starting to show signs of CTF should contact their physicians immediately.

Tick removal
Ticks should be removed promptly and carefully with tweezers and by applying gentle, steady traction. The tick's body should not be crushed when it is removed and the tweezers should be placed as close to the skin as possible to avoid leaving tick mouthparts in the skin. Mouthparts left in the skin can allow secondary infections. Ticks should not be removed with bare hands. Hands should be protected by gloves or tissues and thoroughly washed with soap and water after the removal process.

A match or flame should not be used to remove a tick. This method, once thought safe, can cause the tick to regurgitate expelling any disease it may be carrying into the bite wound.

Epidemiology
The disease develops from March to September, with the highest infections occurring in June. The disease is found almost exclusively in the western United States and Canada, mostly in high mountain areas such as Colorado and Idaho. The CTFV was first isolated from human blood in 1944.

References

External links 

Zoonoses
Arthropod-borne viral fevers and viral haemorrhagic fevers
Tick-borne diseases
Coltiviruses